Paul Fearnhead is Professor of Statistics at Lancaster University. He is a researcher in computational statistics, in particular Sequential Monte Carlo methods. His interests include sampling theory and genetics – he has published several papers working on the epidemiology of campylobacter by looking at recombination events in a large sample of genomes. Since January 2018 he has been the editor of Biometrika.

Awards 

Fearnhead won the Adams Prize in 2007.

In 2007 he also won the Guy Medal in Bronze of the Royal Statistical Society.

References

External links 
 

Living people
Year of birth missing (living people)
English statisticians
Academics of Lancaster University
Computational statisticians
Alumni of the University of Oxford